The Port of Reggio is a seaport in the Mediterranean Sea serving the Italian city of Reggio Calabria.

The position of the ancient Ausonian-Italic and Greek port is unknown. At that time, the port was located in the southern part of the Reggio coast. During Roman times, the port, called Columna Rhegina was located in the northern part of the Reggio coast, near the Strait of Messina between Sicily and Calabria. The present-day port, enlarged after 1908 earthquake, just takes up the western part of the Santa Caterina neighbourhood, near the city centre.

The port connects Reggio and its surroundings to Messina, Catania, Aeolian Islands, Taormina and Malta.

Ports and harbours of Italy